"Awake" is the first single released by American heavy metal band Mutiny Within from their self titled debut album. It was digitally released on November 16, 2009, and was offered as a free download on November 2 for only 24 hours at Roadrunner Records official website to promote their new album. A demo version of the song was included on the compilation album "Annual Assault", released by Roadrunner in 2009, which included songs from other Roadrunner's heavy metal bands, like Trivium, Slipknot and Machine Head.

Music video
A music video was released for "Awake" on January 7, 2010. The clip, which was directed by Patrick Kendall (known by his work with Megadeth, Incubus and Sugarcult), features the band playing the song at an old factory outside their hometown.

Personnel
Mutiny Within
 Chris Clancy – vocals
 Daniel Bage – guitars
 Brandon Jacobs – guitars, guitar solo
 Andrew Jacobs – bass guitar
 Drew Stavola – keyboards, keyboard solo
 Bill Fore – drums

Production
 Jason Bieler – producer
 Matt LaPlant – engineering, digital editing
 Jason Suecof – additional production, digital editing, additional engineering
 Mark Lewis – additional engineering, additional digital editing
 Michael Leslie – additional engineering, additional digital editing
 Chris Clancy – additional digital editing, art direction
 Martyn "Ginge" Ford – mixer
 Jeff Rose – mixer
 Ted Jensen – mastering
 Viktor Koen – art direction, design, illustration
 Bill Fore – art direction
 Pieter M. Van Hattem – photography
 Madelyn Scarpulla – art supervision
 Gail Marowitz – creative direction

References

External links

Mutiny Within at Roadrunner Records

2009 songs
Roadrunner Records singles
2009 singles

fr:Mutiny Within
pt:Mutiny Within
ru:Mutiny Within
fi:Mutiny Within